Liberty Center is an unincorporated community in southern Warren County, Iowa, United States. It lies along U.S. Route 65 south of the city of Indianola, the county seat of Warren County.  Its elevation is 1,024 feet (312 m), and it is located at about  (41.2043016, -93.4999210).  Although Liberty Center is unincorporated, it has a post office, with the ZIP code of 50145, which opened on 7 March 1865.

History
Liberty Center was laid out in 1875. Its population in 1915 was 74.

Education
Southeast Warren Community School District, headquartered in Liberty Center, was formed in 1959 as a consolidation of area schools. It operates SE Warren Elementary in Milo, SE Warren Intermediate in Lacona, and SE Warren Junior-Senior High in Liberty Center.

References

Unincorporated communities in Warren County, Iowa
1875 establishments in Iowa
Unincorporated communities in Iowa